Local elections were held in Valenzuela on May 9, 2022, as part of the Philippine general election. Held concurrently with the national elections, the electorate voted to elect a mayor, a vice mayor, twelve city council members, and two district representatives to congress. Those elected took their respective offices on June 30, 2022, for a three-year-long term. 350,676 out of 443,611 registered voters voted in this election.

Representative Wes Gatchalian and Vice Mayor Lorena Natividad-Borja were elected to the city's mayoralty and vice mayoralty respectively, with Gatchalian being elected to his first term and Natividad-Borja being re-elected for her second. The NPC-affiliated Team Tuloy ang Progreso, Valenzuela won all twelve seats in the city council, securing the coalition complete control of the legislative body. 

Outgoing Mayor Rex Gatchalian and Representative Eric Martinez were elected to represent the first and second districts respectively in the 19th Congress. The former was elected for his first term while the latter was elected for his third.

Mayoral and vice mayoral election 
Incumbent mayor Rexlon "Rex" Gatchalian was elected to a third term as mayor in the 2019 elections. Due to term limits, he is ineligible to run for re-election; his party, the Nationalist People's Coalition nominated his brother, two-term representative Wes Gatchalian in his place. His main opponent was Engineer Bombit Bernardo, the standard bearer of Lingkod ng Mamamayan ng Valenzuela City (LINKOD).

Incumbent vice mayor Lorena "Lorie" Natividad-Borja was elected to a second term as vice mayor in the 2019 elections after having served as a councilor representing the second district from 2001 to 2007 and from 2010 to 2016. Her main opponent was Karuhatan Barangay Captain Ricardo "Boy" De Gula.

Congressional election 
The incumbent first district representative was Weslie T. Gatchalian, younger brother to both senator Sherwin T. Gatchalian and incumbent mayor Rexlon T. Gatchalian. Weslie was on his second term as representative.

For the second district, incumbent representative Eric Martinez was also on his second term. He faced against former Valenzuela lone district and former Representative Magtanggol "Magi" Gunigundo in the election.

Candidates

Administration coalition

Primary opposition coalition

Independent

Election results 
The winners of the congressional, mayor and vice mayor seats of Valenzuela City is determined with the highest number of votes received. These positions are voted separately, so there is a possibility that the winning officials came from the same or different political parties.

Mayoral election 
Incumbent mayor was Rexlon "Rex" T. Gatchalian.

Vice Mayoral election 
Incumbent vice mayor was Lorena "Lorie" Natividad-Borja.

Congressional elections

First district 
Incumbent representative was Weslie Gatchalian.

Second district 
Incumbent representative was Eric Martinez.

City council elections 

The voters in the city elected six councilors on the district where they are registered. Each district elects its own set of councilors via multiple non-transferable vote.

First district

Second district

References 

Valenzuela, Metro Manila
2022 Local
May 2022 events in the Philippines
2022 elections in Metro Manila